The Lords of Thannhausen are an old and still existing German noble family with the rank of Freiherr (Baron). They were members of the German nobility and achieved the status of Imperial Knights. Their ancestral seat is in the Swabian municipality of Tannhausen near Ellwangen.

History
During the Carolingian dynasty, the family's Frankish ancestors settled the Nördlinger Ries area in northeastern Alamannia. Their residence Tannhausen (not to be confused with Thannhausen near Günzburg or Thannhausen, Styria) was first mentioned in an 1100 deed. In the Duchy of Swabia, the Thannhausens held large estates and important offices, as documented under the rule of the Hohenstaufen duke Frederick II in 1112 and 1115.

Following the writings of Felix Fabri (1438/39–1502), it is also assumed that the medieval minnesinger and poet Tannhäuser (d. after 1265) was an offspring of this family and that he may be identical with Lupoldus Danhäuser mentioned in a 1246 deed issued by the Franconian counts of Hohenlohe. More likely, however, the poet descended from a de Tanhusen dynasty of Imperial ministeriales from the Bavarian Nordgau.

Family members were also entrusted with public offices in the modern era: in 1552, William of Thannhausen (1518–1596) is documented as a cavalry captain (Hauptmann) in the service of the Hohenzollern margraves of Ansbach, succeeded by his son Hans-Wolf (1555–1635) during the Thirty Years' War. Until 1849, later generations served mainly with the House of Oettingen-Wallerstein. After that, they served the Kings of Württemberg as officers or in forestry, as well as the Princes of Hohenzollern-Sigmaringen and the Franconian Bishops of Würzburg. The brothers Frederick and Maximilian of Thannhausen were commanders in the French Grande Armée and were killed in the Napoleonic Wars.

Over the centuries, the family seat was exposed to wars and fires; it burned down in 1567, 1621, and 1649. The castle's current appearance dates from 1767.

References
D.J. Haller and H. Dannenbauer: Von den Karolingern zu den Staufern (Karl Rudolph Schnith, ed.) — Die altdeutsche Kaiserzeit (900–1250), Styria, Graz 1990, 
Dieter Kudorfer: "Das Ries zur Karolingerzeit" in Zeitschrift für bayerische Landesgeschichte, 1970
Malte Bischoff: "Archiv der Freiherren von und zu Thannhausen" in Inventare der nichtstaatlichen Archive in Baden-Württemberg, vol. 24, Kohlhammer Verlag, Stuttgart 1998, 
Genealogisches Handbuch des Adels, Freiherrliche Häuser, vol. VIII 1971, Almanach de Gotha

External links

Homepage
State Archive Ludwigsburg, Tannhausen estate

German noble families